Elizabeth Fuller may refer to:

Elizabeth Fuller, English school founder
Elizabeth Ann Fuller, New Zealand children's book illustrator
Liz Fuller, Welsh television presenter, actress, model, and media personality